Molla Veys (also Romanized as Mollā Veys; also known as Kalāteh-ye Mollā Veys and Kalāteh-ye Mollāvīsh) is a village in Darband Rural District, Jolgeh Sankhvast District, Jajrom County, North Khorasan Province, Iran. At the 2006 census, its population was 226, in 54 families.

References 

Populated places in Jajrom County